Renato Galeazzi (born 22 October 1945) is an Italian politician who served as a Deputy (2001–2008) and Mayor of Ancona (1993–2001).

References

1945 births
Living people
Mayors of Ancona
Deputies of Legislature XIV of Italy
Deputies of Legislature XV of Italy